Rother (or Röther) is a surname. It can refer to:

Anthony Rother (born 1972), German electronic music composer, producer and label owner
Artur Rother (1885–1972), German opera conductor
Björn Rother (born 1996), German footballer
Caitlin Rother (born ?), Canadian-born U.S. author and journalist
Helene Rother (1908–1999), German-born U.S. automotive and industrial  designer
Jason Rother (1969–1988), United States Marine Corps Lance Corporal whose abandonment caused a scandal
Joachim Rother (born 1948), German Olympian backstroke swimmer
Leopold Rother (1894–1978), German architect, urban planner, and educator
Michael Rother (born 1950), German experimental musician and composer
Mike Rother (born 1958), U.S. engineer, researcher, teacher, and public speaker
Sabine Röther (born 1957), East German handball player and Olympic competitor
Stanley Rother (1935–1981), U.S. Catholic priest, missionary to Guatemala, and murder victim 
Wilfried Rother (born 1990), French footballer

Surnames from nicknames